Ugh! is an arcade/flight game developed by Egosoft and published in 1992 by Play Byte for the Amiga, Commodore 64, and MS-DOS. It is a clone of the 1984 Commodore 64 game Space Taxi.

Ugh! was later distributed as shareware mainly via Bulletin Board Systems and magazine cover disks.

Gameplay

The game features a caveman who, in order to appeal to his beloved future mate, controls a stone-age muscle-powered helicopter, picking up passengers and flying them to the desired location for money. The player must venture through 69 levels, and must evade natural obstacles as well as hostile Dinosaurs and "Birds" (actually pterosaurs). Collisions with obstacles, hard landings and touching obstacles with the helicopter's rotor inflict damage to the helicopter. Also, powering the helicopter exhausts the pilot, which may be recovered by picking up fruits knocked off a Tree with a Stone. Stone may be also dropped on a hostile monster, knocking it out for a short time.

There is a cooperative simultaneous two player mode.

The game keeps tracks of the player's progress using level codes; the codes for single player levels are Christian Death song titles, the two-player codes are song titles by Current 93.

References

External links

Ugh! at Lemon Amiga

1992 video games
Amiga games
Commodore 64 games
DOS games
Egosoft games
Helicopter video games
Multiplayer and single-player video games
Prehistoric people in popular culture
Video game clones
Video games about taxis
Video games developed in Germany
Video games set in prehistory